Springhill is an unincorporated community in Livingston County, in the U.S. state of Missouri.

History
Springhill was originally called Navestown, and under the latter name sprang up in the 1830s about a store started by Jesse Nave, who named the site after himself. The present name is for the springs near the original town site. A post office called Naves Store was established in 1838, the name was changed to Spring Hill in 1849, and the post office closed in 1901.

References

Unincorporated communities in Livingston County, Missouri
Unincorporated communities in Missouri